Jeff Oaks (born 1964) is an American poet and essayist who is a senior lecturer at the University of Pittsburgh and the assistant director of the writing program.

Background
Born in 1964, Oaks was raised in the Finger Lakes region of Upstate New York.  According to Oaks, he started writing around age 17.  Always fascinated by insects, Oaks originally planned to study entomology in college.  However, he soon became bored with his science classes and turned his focus to creative writing. Oaks graduated from the Binghamton University with a bachelor's degree in English Literature.

Oaks received a graduate degree in poetry at the University of Montana and his Master of Fine Arts degree in poetry at the University of Pittsburgh in 1990.

Oaks is a Pittsburgh, Pennsylvania resident.

Works
Oaks is the author of four poetry chapbooks, including Mistakes with Strangers,  Shift, The Moon of Books  and The Unknown Country. He is also a recipient of three Pennsylvania Council on the Arts fellowships and has published poems in Assaracus, Field, Bloom, Mid-American Review, Zócalo Public Square, and Superstition Review. Oaks' poem Saint Wrench was selected for Best New Poets 2012 by poet Matthew Dickman.

Oaks' essays have appeared in At Length, Creative Nonfiction, Kenyon Review Online, and in the anthologies Brief Encounters: A Collection of Contemporary Nonfiction and  My Diva: 65 Gay Men on the Women Who Inspire Them.  In 1999, Oaks was nominated for the Pushcart Prize.

Teaching
Oaks has taught at the University of Pittsburgh, first as a teaching assistant, then as part-time faculty, then as a full-time, non-tenure stream lecturer. From 1999 to 2011, he managed the Pittsburgh Contemporary Writers Series, bringing from six to 13 well-known writers each year to campus for free readings and talks.

In 2011 Oaks was promoted to senior lecturer and became the assistant director of the University of Pittsburgh writing program. He specializes in teaching creative writing, but he has also taught in the composition and literature programs.

For many years, Oaks worked as a writer-in-residence for the Western Pennsylvania Writing Project at the School of Education, University of Pittsburgh.  He partnered with local secondary school teachers in summer workshops as well as inventing stand alone visits to local schools. Oaks has taught writing classes at the State Correctional Institution – Pittsburgh, The Ellis School in Pittsburgh, the Carnegie Museum School and the Carnegie Library.

In 2008, Oaks received the Tina and David Bellet Arts and Sciences Teaching Excellence Award for his university teaching.

Books
 The Unknown Country, poetry (Brockport, New York: State Street Press, 1994).
 The Moon of Books, poetry (Lincoln, Nebraska: Ultima Obscura Press, 2000).
 Shift, poetry (Lewisburg, Pennsylvania: Seven Kitchens Press, 2010).
 Mistakes with Strangers, poetry (Lewisburg, PA: Seven Kitchens Press, 2014)

References

Sources
Contemporary Authors Online. The Gale Group, 2007.

External links
 poet's webpage at Wordpress
 Oaks, Jeff. "What Is To Be Done with Silence?" (poem). Columbia, Missouri: University of Missouri, College of Arts & Science, The Missouri Review, November 20, 2017.

1964 births
Living people
University of Pittsburgh faculty
Writers from Pittsburgh
Binghamton University alumni